The Valdostan regional election of 1988 took place on 26 –27 June 1988.

Many “coup de theatre” happened during this term. Two years after the election the Christian Democracy fired the Valdostan Union, but later the UV fired itself the Christian Democrats with the help of the Progressive Democratic Autonomists.

Results

Sources: Regional Council of Aosta Valley and Istituto Cattaneo

Elections in Aosta Valley
1988 elections in Italy
June 1988 events in Europe